Aeroálcool is a Brazilian aerospace company based at Franca, São Paulo.

History
The company was founded in 2001 by Omar Pugliesi and the US-American James Waterhouse, originally to produce the ultralight aircraft Aeroalcool Quasar. In the meantime, the company also develop technologies to run engines with ethanol. 

Aeroálcool operates in the aerospace industry, with the development and production, as well as the license construction of aircraft and components. In addition, unmanned aerial vehicles for civil and military purposes are designed and built.

Aircraft

See also
Aero Bravo
List of aircraft manufacturers

References

External links

Aircraft manufacturers of Brazil
Companies based in São Paulo (state)
Brazilian brands